Samrambham is a 1983 Indian Malayalam film, directed by Baby and produced by Thiruppathi Chettiyar. The film stars Madhu.Balan.K.Nair, Sunanda, Shankar and Anuradha in the lead roles. The film has musical score by K. J. Joy. The movie is loosely based on the 1972 Hindi movie Victoria No. 203.

Cast
Madhuas Vasu
Sunanda Rani
Shankar as Raghu
Anuradha
Balan K. Nair Raghavan
 Janardhanan as Johny
 Jose Prakash Mahendran
 Bheeman Raghu as Rafi
 C.I Paul
 TG Ravi
 Manavalan Joseph
 Vallathol Unnikrishnan
 Prathap Chandran
 Nellikode Bhaskaran

Soundtrack
The music was composed by K. J. Joy and the lyrics were written by Poovachal Khader, Pappanamkodu Lakshmanan.

References

External links
 

1983 films
1980s Malayalam-language films
Films directed by Baby (director)